Nancy Bohn Doe (born 1949) is a former First Lady of Liberia.

Biography
Nancy was born in 1949 in Zwedru, Grand Gedeh County. She moved to Monrovia in the 1960s, where she worked as a merchant. She married Samuel Doe, who was in the Liberian Armed Forces, in either 1968 or 1969. Together, they had four children. After Samuel gained control of Liberia in the 1980 coup d’état, Nancy became First Lady. As first lady, she established a national market women's association. The Nancy B. Doe Market, in Jorkpeh Town, Sinkor, was established in her honor. In June 1983, during a visit to the United States, Nancy helped establish scholarship opportunities for Liberian students at Chicago State University.

After her husband Samuel was executed in 1990, and the First Liberian Civil War began, Doe went into exile. She returned to Liberia after the second civil war, sometime before 2005. On 12 November 2016, Doe filed a lawsuit against the Liberian government to the ECOWAS Court, claiming the government denied her access to the bank accounts of her deceased husband. In 2019, the court ruled in favor of Doe, ordering the government to pay Doe a sum of $18 million U.S. dollars. As of 2020, Doe is yet to be paid the money ordered by the court.

In 2020, Doe called for her husband to be given a state reburial.

References

Living people
1949 births
First ladies and gentlemen of Liberia
People from Grand Gedeh County
People from Monrovia
20th-century Liberian women
21st-century Liberian women